Antonio Pérez Delgadillo (born 16 April 1978) is a Mexican former professional footballer who played as a goalkeeper.

Born in Guadalajara, Toño Pérez began playing professional football with local Club Atlas, and he became the club's starting goalkeeper by early 2006.

References

External links
 
 
 

1978 births
Living people
Mexican footballers
Footballers from Guadalajara, Jalisco
Atlante F.C. footballers
Club León footballers
Association football goalkeepers